The Pocahontas State Correctional Center is a medium-security prison located on  in Tazewell County, just west of the town of Pocahontas, Virginia.  The $68.6 million facility was completed in the summer of 2007, and opened in September, 2007.

Details
The prison has the capacity to house 1,000 inmates in the general population, and 24 inmates in the segregation units.  The number of people employed at the prison is expected to reach 330.

The prison will provide counseling and group programs, including Alcoholics Anonymous, Narcotics Anonymous, Anger Control, Breaking Barriers, and Phases I and II of Psycho-Educational Substance Abuse. Because of the amount of prisoners, and lack of staff and resources, many inmates go months, and some even years without enrolling in any program or classes, and because of this, many get released without getting any type of rehabilitation or education.

Basic education/GED preparation, Literary Incentive Program, and college courses will be offered to inmates.  Additionally, vocational courses will be provided, including electricity, small engine and motorcycle repair, floor covering, general maintenance, carpentry, plumbing and computer literacy.

Responsible for overseeing and constructing of the prison was Warden S. K. Young, a graduate of Emory and Henry College.  Mr. Young has 26 years of experience dealing with prisons at all levels.

Pocahontas State Correctional Center will have a recycling program for paper, aluminum cans, plastic bottles, cardboard, and printer cartridges.  Additionally, the prison will produce bio-diesel fuel from waste oil from the kitchen.  This fuel will be used in motor vehicles operated by the prison.

External links
 Virginia Department of Corrections: Pocahontas State Correctional Center

References
 Bluefield Daily Telegraph
 Pocahontas State Correctional Center brochure

Buildings and structures in Tazewell County, Virginia
Prisons in Virginia
2007 establishments in Virginia